Breakout Kings is an American crime drama television series that premiered on the A&E Network on March 6, 2011. The series was created by Nick Santora and Matt Olmstead, who previously worked together on Prison Break. It premiered as the most-watched original drama series in A&E's history among adults 25–54 and adults 18–49, delivering 1.6 million adults 25–54 and 1.5 million adults 18–49. The series was picked up for a second season on July 6, 2011. The season finale of the second season aired on April 29, 2012 at 9 p.m. ET/PT featured two hours of back-to-back episodes "Freakshow" and "Served Cold" instead of the usual one-hour episode at 10 p.m. Executive producer and creator Nick Santora once opined, "Our DVR+7 day numbers are really strong. A lot of people are watching the show; a lot of them just don't watch it on the night it premieres."

On May 17, 2012, A&E canceled Breakout Kings after two seasons, with co-creator Matt Olmstead choosing to move on to another series.

Series overview

Episodes

Season 1 (2011)

Season 2 (2012)

References

External links
 Breakout Kings Episodes at A&E official website
 
 List of Breakout Kings Episodes at TVDB.com

Breakout Kings
Episodes